In classical antiquity, writers such as Herodotus, Plato, Xenophon, Athenaeus and many others explored aspects of homosexuality in Greek society. The most widespread and socially significant form of same-sex sexual relations in ancient Greece amongst elite circles was between adult men and pubescent or adolescent boys, known as pederasty (marriages in Ancient Greece between men and women were also age structured, with men in their thirties commonly taking wives in their early teens).  Nevertheless, homosexuality and its practices were still wide-spread as certain city-states allowed it while others were ambiguous or prohibited it. Though sexual relationships between adult men did exist, it is possible at least one member of each of these relationships flouted social conventions by assuming a passive sexual role according to Kenneth Dover, though this has been questioned by recent scholars. It is unclear how such relations between same-sex partners were regarded in the general society, especially for women, but examples do exist as far back as the time of Sappho. 

The ancient Greeks did not conceive of sexual orientation as a social identifier as modern Western societies have done.  Greek society did not distinguish sexual desire or behavior by the gender of the participants, but rather by the role that each participant played in the sex act, that of active penetrator or passive penetrated.
Within the traditions of pederasty, active/passive polarization corresponded with dominant and submissive social roles: the active (penetrative) role was associated with masculinity, higher social status, and adulthood, while the passive role was associated with femininity, lower social status, and youth.

Pederasty

The most common form of same-sex relationships between elite males in Greece was paiderastia (pederasty), meaning "boy love".  It was a relationship between an older male and an adolescent youth. A boy was considered a "boy" until he was able to grow a full beard. In Athens the older man was called erastes. He was to educate, protect, love, and provide a role model for his eromenos, whose reward for him lay in his beauty, youth, and promise. Such a concept is backed up by archeological evidence experts have found throughout the years, such as a bronze plaque of an older man carrying a bow an arrow while grabbing a younger man by the arms- who is carrying a goat. Furthermore, the boy's genitals are exposed in the plaque, thus experts interpret this, and more evidence comparative to this, as the practice of pederasty.

The roots of Greek pederasty lie in the tribal past of Greece, before the rise of the city-state as a unit of political organization. These tribal communities were organized according to age groups.  When it came time for a boy to embrace the age group of the adult and to "become a man", he would leave the tribe in the company of an older man for a period of time that constituted a rite of passage.  This older man would educate the youth in the ways of Greek life and the responsibilities of adulthood.

The rite of passage undergone by Greek youths in the tribal prehistory of Greece evolved into the commonly known form of Greek pederasty after the rise of the city-state, or polis.  Greek boys no longer left the confines of the community, but rather paired up with older men within the confines of the city.  These men, like their earlier counterparts, played an educational and instructive role in the lives of their young companions; likewise, just as in earlier times, they shared a sexual relationship with their boys. Penetrative sex, however, was seen as demeaning for the passive partner, and outside the socially accepted norm. In ancient Greece, sex was generally understood in terms of penetration, pleasure, and dominance, rather than a matter of the sexes of the participants. According to Dover, pederasty was not considered to be a homosexual act, given that the 'man' would be taking on a dominant role, and his disciple would be taking on a passive one. When intercourse occurred between two people of the same gender, it still was not entirely regarded as a homosexual union, given that one partner would have to take on a passive role, and would therefore no longer be considered a 'man' in terms of the sexual union. Hubbard and James Davidson argue however that there is insufficient evidence that a man was considered effeminate for being passive in sex alone. For example, the lowborn protagonist of Aristophanes' play The Knights openly admits to having been a passive partner.

An elaborate social code governed the mechanics of Greek pederasty.  It was the duty of the adult man to court the boy who struck his fancy, and it was viewed as socially appropriate for the younger man to withhold for a while before capitulating to his mentor's desires. At first, both erastes and eromenos, show constraint and restraint their pursuit. Soon after, the younger man gives in to his new mentor—erastes—and receives guidance from him. Nevertheless, it is not certain that those in submission will enjoy such "trainings" from his mentor—including sexual favors. However, it is important to note that not all pederastic relationships were sexual—many were simply forms of friendship and guidance.

The age limit for pederasty in ancient Greece seems to encompass, at the minimum end, boys of twelve years of age. To love a boy below the age of twelve was considered inappropriate, but no evidence exists of any legal penalties attached to this sort of practice. Traditionally, a pederastic relationship could continue until the widespread growth of the boy's body hair, when he is considered a man. Therefore, though relationships such as this were more temporary, it had longer, lasting effects on those involved. In ancient Spartan weddings, the bride had her hair cropped short and was dressed as a man. It was suggested by George Devereux that this was to make the husband's transition from homosexual to heterosexual relationships easier. This marks these pederasty relationships as temporary, developmental ones, not one of sexual and intimate connection like with a woman. During these times, homosexuality was seen as normal and necessary due to the power dynamic at play between an older, dominant man, and a younger, submissive one. Yet, when two men of similar age shared a similar relationship, it was deemed taboo and, in fact, perverse.  

The ancient Greeks, in the context of the pederastic city-states, were the first to describe, study, systematize, and establish pederasty as a social and educational institution. It was an important element in civil life, the military, philosophy and the arts.  There is some debate among scholars about whether pederasty was widespread in all social classes, or largely limited to the aristocracy.

In the military

The Sacred Band of Thebes, a separate military unit made up of pairs of male lovers, is usually considered the prime example of how the ancient Greeks used love between soldiers in a troop to boost their fighting spirit. The Thebans attributed to the Sacred Band the power of Thebes for the generation before its fall to Philip II of Macedon, who, when he surveyed the dead after the Battle of Chaeronea (338 BC) and saw the bodies of the Sacred Band strewn on the battlefield, delivered this harsh criticism of the Spartan views of the band:
Perish miserably they who think that these men did or suffered aught disgraceful.

Pammenes' opinion, according to Plutarch, was that
Homer's Nestor was not well skilled in ordering an army when he advised the Greeks to rank tribe and tribe...he should have joined lovers and their beloved. For men of the same tribe little value one another when dangers press; but a band cemented by friendship grounded upon love is never to be broken.

These bonds, reflected in episodes from Greek mythology, such as the heroic relationship between Achilles and Patroclus in the Iliad, were thought to boost morale as well as bravery due to the desire to impress and protect their lover. Such relationships were documented by many Greek historians and in philosophical discourses, as well as in offhand remarks such as Philip II of Macedon's recorded by Plutarch demonstrates:
It is not only the most warlike peoples, the Boeotians, Spartans, and Cretans, who are the most susceptible to this kind of love but also the greatest heroes of old: Meleager, Achilles, Aristomenes, Cimon, and Epaminondas.

During the Lelantine War between the Eretrians and the Chalcidians, before a decisive battle the Chalcidians called for the aid of a warrior named Cleomachus (glorious warrior).  He answered their request, bringing his lover to watch.  Leading the charge against the Eretrians he brought the Chalcidians to victory at the cost of his own life. The Chalcidians erected a tomb for him in the marketplace in gratitude.

Love between adult men

According to the opinion of the classicist Kenneth Dover who published Greek Homosexuality in 1978, given the importance in Greek society of cultivating the masculinity of the adult male and the perceived feminizing effect of being the passive partner, relations between adult men of comparable social status were considered highly problematic, and usually associated with social stigma.  This stigma, however, was reserved for only the passive partner in the relationship.  According to Dover and his supporters, Greek males who engaged in passive anal sex after reaching the age of manhood—at which point they were expected to take the reverse role in pederastic relationships and become the active and dominant member—thereby were feminized or "made a woman" of themselves. Dover refers to insults used in the plays of Aristophanes as evidence 'passive' men were ridiculed.

More recent work published by James Davidson and Hubbard have challenged this model, arguing that it is reductionist and have provided evidence to the contrary.

The legislator Philolaus of Corinth, lover of the stadion race winner Diocles of Corinth at the Ancient Olympic Games of 728 BC, crafted laws for the Thebans in the 8th century BC that gave special support to male unions, contributing to the development of Theban pederasty in which, unlike other places in ancient Greece, it favored the continuity of the union of male couples even after the younger man reached adulthood, the most famous example being the Sacred Band of Thebes, composed of elite soldiers in pairs of male lovers in the 4th century BC, as was also the case with him and Diocles, who lived together in Thebes until the end of their lives.

The romance between Pausanias and Agathon in Athens, made famous by their appearance in Plato's Symposium, also continued from the pederastic phase into adulthood as a stable and long-lasting relationship.

Achilles and Patroclus

The first recorded appearance of a deep emotional bond between adult men in ancient Greek culture was in the Iliad (800 BC). Homer does not depict the relationship between Achilles and Patroclus as sexual.  The ancient Athenians emphasised the supposed age difference between the two by portraying Patroclus with a beard in paintings and pottery, while Achilles is clean-shaven, although Achilles was an almost godlike figure in Greek society. This led to a disagreement about which to perceive as erastes and which eromenos among elites such as Aeschylus and Pausanias, since Homeric tradition made Patroclus out to be older but Achilles stronger. It has been noted, however, that the depictions of characters on pottery do not represent reality and may cater to the beauty standards of ancient Athens. Other ancients such as Xenophon held that Achilles and Patroclus were simply close friends.

Aeschylus in the tragedy Myrmidons made Achilles the erastes since he had avenged his lover's death even though the gods told him it would cost his own life. However, the character of Phaedrus in Plato's Symposium asserts that Homer emphasized the beauty of Achilles, which would qualify him, not Patroclus, as eromenos.

Theseus and Pirithous
Theseus and Pirithous are another famous pair of close adult male best friends of the same age whose strong bond has homoerotic connotations according to some ancient authors.

Pirithous had heard stories of Theseus's courage and strength in battle but wanted proof so he rustled Theseus's herd of cattle and drove it from Marathon and Theseus set out in pursuit. Pirithous took up his arms and the pair met to do battle but were so impressed with each other's gracefulness, beauty and courage they took an oath of friendship.

According to Ovid, Phaedra, Theseus' wife, felt left out by her husband's love for Pirithous and she used this as an excuse to try to convince her stepson, Hippolytus, to accept being her lover, as Theseus also neglected his son because he preferred to spend long periods with his companion.

Orestes and Pylades

Orestes and Pylades, similarly to Achilles and Patroclus, are cousins who grew up together from childhood to adulthood. Their relationship is stronger and more intimate than any of their relationships with other people.

The relationship between them has been interpreted by some authors from Roman times onwards as romantic or homoerotic. The dialogue Erotes ("Affairs of the Heart"), attributed to Lucian, compares the merits and advantages of heteroeroticism and homoeroticism, and Orestes and Pylades are presented as the principal representatives of a loving friendship.

In 1734, George Frederic Handel's opera Oreste (based on Giangualberto Barlocci's Roman libretto of 1723), was premiered in London's Covent Garden. The fame of Lucian's works in the 18th century, as well as the generally well-known tradition of Greco-Roman heroic homoeroticism, made it natural for theatre audiences of that period to have recognized an intense, romantic, if not positively homoerotic quality, to the relationship between Orestes and Pylades.

Alexander and Hephaestion

Alexander the Great had a close emotional attachment to his companion, cavalry commander (hipparchus) and childhood friend, Hephaestion. He was "by far the dearest of all the king's friends; he had been brought up with Alexander and shared all his secrets." This relationship lasted throughout their lives, and was compared, by others as well as themselves, to that of Achilles and Patroclus.

Hephaestion studied with Alexander, as did a handful of other children of Ancient Macedonian aristocracy, under the tutelage of Aristotle. Hephaestion makes his appearance in history at the point when Alexander reaches Troy. There they made sacrifices at the shrines of the two heroes Achilles and Patroclus; Alexander honoring Achilles, and Hephaestion honoring Patroclus.

According to Robin Lane Fox, Alexander and Hephaestion were possible lovers. After Hephaestion's death in Oct 324 BC, Alexander mourned him greatly and did not eat for days. Alexander held an elaborate funeral for Hephaestion at Babylon, and sent a note to the shrine of Ammon, which had previously acknowledged Alexander as a god, asking them to grant Hephaestion divine honours. The priests declined, but did offer him the status of divine hero. Alexander died soon after receiving this letter; Mary Renault suggests that his grief over Hephaestion's death had led him to be careless with his health.

Alexander was overwhelmed by his grief for Hephaestion, so much that Arrian records that Alexander "flung himself on the body of his friend and lay there nearly all day long in tears, and refused to be parted from him until he was dragged away by force by his Companions". Some have suggested that they shared a homosexual relationship together, however historians have challenged that claim, stating instead that Hephaestion was "his closest and dearest friend".

Love between adult women 
Sappho, a poet from the island of Lesbos, wrote many love poems addressed to women and girls. The love in these poems is sometimes requited, and sometimes not. Sappho is thought to have written close to 12,000 lines of poetry on her love for other women. Of these, only about 600 lines have survived. As a result of her fame in antiquity, she and her land have become emblematic of love between women.

Pedagogic erotic relationships are also documented for Sparta, together with athletic nudity for women. During the year 610 B.C., a group of teenage girls was documented singing classic hymns about their Gods and Goddesses, as well as ties to them, while involved in ploughing rituals in a mountain range. Nevertheless, such hymns would further in content as the girls flirt with and tease one another with hints of sexual energy. Plato's Symposium mentions women who "do not care for men, but have female attachments". In general, however, the historical record of love and sexual relations between women is sparse.

Scholarship and controversy
After a long hiatus marked by censorship of homosexual themes, modern historians picked up the threads, starting with Erich Bethe in 1907 and continuing with K. J. Dover and many others. These scholars have shown that same-sex relations were openly practised, largely with official sanction, in many areas of life from the 7th century BC until the Roman era.

Some scholars believe that same-sex relationships, especially pederasty, were common only among the aristocracy, and that such relationships were not widely practised by the common people (demos). One such scholar is Bruce Thornton, who argues that insults directed at pederastic males in the comedies of Aristophanes show the common people's dislike for the practice. Even those who argue that pederasty was limited to the upper classes generally concede that it was "part of the social structure of the polis".

Considerable controversy has engaged the scholarly world concerning the nature of same-sex relationships among the ancient Greeks described by Thomas Hubbard in the Introduction to Homosexuality in Greece and Rome, A Source Book of Basic Documents, 2007, p. 2: "The field of Gay Studies has, virtually since its inception, been divided between 'essentialists' those who believe in an archetypical pattern of same gender attraction that is universal, transhistorical, and transcultural, and "social constructionists", those who hold that patterns of sexual preference manifest themselves with different significance in different societies and that no essential identity exists between practitioners of same-gender love in, for instance, ancient Greece and post industrial Western society. Some social constructionists have even gone so far as to deny that sexual preference was a significant category for the ancients or that any kind of subculture based on sexual object-choice existed in the ancient world", p. 2 (he cites Halperin and Foucault in the social constructionist camp and Boswell and Thorp in the essentialist; cf. E. Stein for a collection of essays, Forms of Desire: Sexual Orientation and the Social Constructionist Controversy, 1992). Hubbard states that "Close examination of a range of ancient texts suggests, however, that some forms of sexual preference were, in fact, considered a distinguishing characteristic of individuals. Many texts even see such preferences as inborn qualities and as "essential aspects of human identity..." ibid.  Hubbard utilizes both schools of thought when these seem pertinent to the ancient texts, pp. 2–20.

During Plato's time there were some people who were of the opinion that homosexual sex was shameful in any circumstances. Indeed, Plato himself eventually came to hold this view. At one time he had written that same-sex lovers were far more blessed than ordinary mortals. He even gave them a headstart in the great race to get back to heaven, their mutual love refeathering their mottled wings. Later he seemed to contradict himself. In his ideal city, he says in his last, posthumously published work known as The Laws, homosexual sex will be treated the same way as incest. It is something contrary to nature, he insists, calling it "utterly unholy, odious-to-the-gods and ugliest of ugly things".

The subject has caused controversy in modern Greece. In 2002, a conference on Alexander the Great was stormed as a paper about his homosexuality was about to be presented. When the film Alexander, which depicted Alexander as romantically involved with both men and women, was released in 2004, 25 Greek lawyers threatened to sue the film's makers, but relented after attending an advance screening of the film.

See also

Greek love
History of erotic depictions
History of homosexuality
History of human sexuality
Homosexuality in ancient Rome
Homosexuality in China
Homosexuality in India
Homosexuality in Japan
Homosexuality in the militaries of ancient Greece
Kagema
LGBT rights in Greece
Pederasty in ancient Greece
Malakia
Pederasty
The Sacred Band of Stepsons
Sacred Band of Thebes
Wakashū

Notes

Literature 
 Andrew Calimach, Lovers' Legends: The Gay Greek Myths, New Rochelle, Haiduk Press, 2002, 
 Cohen, David, "Law, Sexuality, and Society: The Enforcement of Morals in Classical Athens". Cambridge University Press, 2004. .
 Lilar, Suzanne, Le couple (1963), Paris, Grasset;  Translated as Aspects of Love in Western Society in 1965, with a foreword by Jonathan Griffin, New York, McGraw-Hill, LC 65–19851.
 Dover, Kenneth J. Greek Homosexuality. Vintage Books, 1978. 
 Halperin, David. One Hundred Years of Homosexuality: And Other Essays on Greek Love. Routledge, 1989. 
 Hornblower, Simon and Spawforth, Antony, eds. The Oxford Classical Dictionary, third edition. Oxford University Press, 1996. 
 Hubbard, Thomas K. Homosexuality in Greece and Rome.; University of California Press, 2003.  
 Percy, III, William A. Pederasty and Pedagogy in Archaic Greece. University of Illinois Press, 1996.  
 Thornton, Bruce S. Eros: the Myth of Ancient Greek Sexuality. Westview Press, 1997. 
Wohl, Victoria. Love Among the Ruins: the Erotics of Democracy in Classical Athens. Princeton University Press, 2002.

External links
 

Pederasty and Pedagogy In Archaic Greece
Homosexuality in History: A Partially Annotated Bibliography.
Ancient Greek Homosexuality
Generally speaking, sexuality in Ancient Athens was well recorded. These ancient artifacts tell the entire story in pictures.

Sexuality in ancient Greece
Ancient
 Greece
Gay history